The 2006 NCAA Division I Indoor Track and Field Championships were contested to determine the individual and team national champions of men's and women's NCAA collegiate indoor track and field events in the United States after the 2004–05 season, the 42nd annual meet for men and 24th annual meet for women.

For the seventh consecutive year, the championships were held at the Randal Tyson Track Center at the University of Arkansas in Fayetteville, Arkansas.

Hosts and defending champions Arkansas won the men's title, the Razorbacks' nineteenth.

Texas won the women's title, the Longhorns' sixth and first since 1999.

Qualification
All teams and athletes from Division I indoor track and field programs were eligible to compete for this year's individual and team titles.

Team standings 
 Note: Top 10 only
 Scoring: 6 points for a 1st-place finish in an event, 4 points for 2nd, 3 points for 3rd, 2 points for 4th, and 1 point for 5th
 (DC) = Defending Champions
 † = Participation vacated by NCAA Committee on Infractions

Men's title
 66 teams scored at least one point

Women's title
 63 teams scored at least one point

See also
2005 NCAA Division I Cross Country Championships
2006 NCAA Division I Outdoor Track and Field Championships

References

NCAA Indoor Track and Field Championships
Ncaa Indoor Track And Field Championships
Ncaa Indoor Track And Field Championships